Mücahit Yağcı (born 2 May 1973) is a Turkish weightlifter. He competed in the men's featherweight event at the 1996 Summer Olympics.

References

1973 births
Living people
Turkish male weightlifters
Olympic weightlifters of Turkey
Weightlifters at the 1996 Summer Olympics
Sportspeople from Eskişehir